Heart of the Rockies may refer to:

 Heart of the Rockies (1937 film), a 1937 film
 Heart of the Rockies (1951 film), a 1951 film
 Heart of the Rockies Regional Medical Center, a hospital in Salida, Colorado